The 1986 Mount Fuji 1000 km was the ninth and final round of the 1986 World Sports-Prototype Championship as well as the fifth round of the 1986 All Japan Endurance Championship.  It took place at Fuji Speedway, Japan on October 5, 1986.

It was the last victory of a Porsche 956 in the World Championship, in the last race where that type of car could race.

Official results
Class winners in bold.  Cars failing to complete 75% of the winner's distance marked as Not Classified (NC).

Statistics
 Pole Position - #17 Brun Motorsport - 2:06.870
 Fastest Lap - #51 Silk Cut Jaguar - 2:09.380
 Average Speed - 179.978 km/h

References

 

Fuji
Fuji
6 Hours of Fuji